Xinjian is a town in Zhongfang County, Hunan province, China. , it has one residential community and eight villages under its administration.

See also 
 List of township-level divisions of Hunan

References 

Towns of Huaihua
Zhongfang County